Iván Morante Ruiz (born 15 January 2001) is a Spanish professional footballer who plays as a midfielder for UD Ibiza.

Club career
Born in León, Castile and León, Morante joined Villarreal CF's youth setup in 2013, from hometown side CD Ejido. He made his senior debut with the reserves on 14 September 2019, coming on as a late substitute for Sergio Lozano in a 3–0 Segunda División B away win over UE Llagostera.

On 30 January 2020, Morante moved to Real Madrid, being initially assigned to the Juvenil A squad. He was promoted to Castilla ahead of the 2020–21 season, and scored his first senior goal on 11 December 2021, netting the opener in a 1–1 Primera División RFEF away draw against Sevilla Atlético.

On 19 July 2022, Morante signed a two-year deal with Segunda División side UD Ibiza. He made his professional debut on 14 August, starting in a 2–0 home loss against Granada CF.

Honours 
Individual

 UEFA European Under-17 Championship Team of the Tournament: 2018

References

External links
 
 

2001 births
Living people
Sportspeople from León, Spain
Spanish footballers
Footballers from Castile and León
Association football midfielders
Segunda División players
Primera Federación players
Segunda División B players
Villarreal CF B players
Real Madrid Castilla footballers
UD Ibiza players
Spain youth international footballers
21st-century Spanish people